Zhong Hui (225 – 3 March 264), courtesy name Shiji, was a Chinese calligrapher, essayist, military general, and politician of the state of Cao Wei during the Three Kingdoms period of China. He was the younger son of Zhang Changpu with Zhong Yao, who served as the Grand Tutor in the Wei imperial court. He was already known for being insightful, intelligent and knowledgeable since he was young. Zhong Hui rose to prominence in the 250s when he became a close aide to Sima Zhao, the regent and de facto ruler of Wei. He advised Sima Zhao on how to deal with the Third Rebellion in Shouchun from 257–258 and was highly regarded by the latter. With Sima Zhao's help, Zhong Hui steadily moved up the ranks and became one of the key figures in the Wei government.

In 263, the Wei imperial court ordered Zhong Hui, Deng Ai and Zhuge Xu to lead separate armies to attack and conquer Wei's rival state, Shu Han. During and after the campaign against Shu, Zhong Hui framed Zhuge Xu and Deng Ai for cowardice and treason respectively, and seized command of their troops. By the time Shu surrendered to Wei in 263, Zhong Hui was in full control of all the Wei military forces in Shu territory. In 264, with backing from Jiang Wei, a former Shu general, Zhong Hui started a rebellion against Sima Zhao. However, the revolt failed when Zhong Hui's plan to purge several Wei officers – because he was worried that they would not support him – was leaked out. The officers escaped from custody, regrouped with their men, mutinied against Zhong Hui, and killed him and Jiang Wei.

Early life and career
Zhong Hui's ancestral home was in Changshe County, Yingchuan Commandery, which is located east of present-day Changge, Henan. He was the younger son of Zhong Yao, who served as the Grand Tutor in the Wei imperial court. At a young age, he was already known for being insightful and intelligent. His mother, Zhang Changpu, was known for being very strict with her son and for her influential role in his early education.

The Wei official Jiang Ji wrote in one of his works that one can tell what a person's character is like by observing his/her eye pupils. When Zhong Hui was four years old, his father sent him to meet Jiang Ji, who noted that the boy was extraordinary. By the time Zhong Hui reached adulthood, he was already famous for being hardworking, well read, and versed in different types of arts. During the Zhengshi era (240–249) of the reign of Cao Fang, he served as a Gentleman Cadet of the Imperial Library and was later promoted to Attendant Gentleman of the Palace Writers and Masters of Writing. He was awarded the title of a Secondary Marquis when Cao Mao ascended the throne in 254.

Zhong Hui studied the Yijing. After his death, a 20-volume book titled Dao Lun was discovered in his house. The book, which was believed to be written by Zhong Hui, discussed either Legalist or Logician philosophy even though its title suggests it was about Taoism. When he reached adulthood, his fame placed him on par with the philosopher Wang Bi, who was about the same age as him.

Gaining the attention of Sima Shi
The Shiyu recorded an incident about how Zhong Hui came to the attention of the Wei regent Sima Shi. Sima Shi instructed Yu Song, the Prefect of the Palace Writers, to draft a memorandum. He was not satisfied after reading Yu Song's draft and ordered him to rewrite. Yu Song was unable to think of a better way to write the memorandum after racking his brains and felt gloomy. Zhong Hui noticed Yu Song looked troubled, so he offered to help him and changed five words in the memorandum. Yu Song was pleased after looking through Zhong Hui's edits and he presented the revised draft to Sima Shi later. After reading it, Sima Shi asked him, "You didn't make these changes. Who edited it?" Yu Song replied, "Zhong Hui. I've been wanting to recommend him to you, my lord. Now that you asked, I shan't keep him to myself anymore." Sima Shi said, "He's capable of shouldering greater responsibilities. Summon him." When Yu Song informed Zhong Hui that Sima Shi wanted to meet him, Zhong asked him about Sima's abilities, to which Yu replied, "He's learned, wise and multi-talented." Zhong Hui stayed at home for about ten days, during which he refused to meet any visitors and carefully thought about what he would say to Sima Shi. On the day he met Sima Shi, he entered Sima's residence early in the morning and left only at midnight. After Zhong Hui left, Sima Shi remarked, "He's truly a great talent capable of assisting rulers."

Pei Songzhi cast doubts on the Shiyu account. He felt that it was unlikely that Yu Song had to recommend Zhong Hui to Sima Shi, because Sima would most probably have already at least heard of Zhong due to the following reasons. First, Zhong Hui came from an elite family background. Second, he was already famous when he was still a youth. Third, he started serving in the Wei government as soon as he reached the age of adulthood. Pei also believed that it was impossible for anyone to be able to tell, simply by reading a piece of writing, that a person who edited a few words in it is capable of shouldering greater responsibilities.

Role in the Shouchun rebellions

Sima Zhao's rise to power

In 255, when the Wei generals Guanqiu Jian and Wen Qin started a rebellion in Shouchun (壽春; present-day Shou County, Anhui), Sima Shi led Wei imperial forces to suppress the revolt, with Zhong Hui accompanying him as an assistant officer. Sima Shi's younger brother, Sima Zhao, followed behind with another army to support them. Sima Shi died in Xuchang after the rebellion was suppressed. He was succeeded by Sima Zhao, who took over command of his troops. At the time, the Wei emperor Cao Mao ordered Sima Zhao to remain in Xuchang and Fu Jia to lead the armies back to the imperial capital, Luoyang. Zhong Hui conspired with Fu Jia to urge Sima Zhao to disregard the emperor's order and lead the troops to a garrison at the south of the Luo River near Luoyang. Sima Zhao became the new regent and continued to remain in control of the Wei government as his brother did before him. Zhong Hui was appointed as a Gentleman of the Yellow Gate and awarded the title "Marquis of Dongwu Village" with 300 taxable households in his marquisate.

Helping to suppress Zhuge Dan's rebellion

In 257, the Wei imperial court summoned the general Zhuge Dan, who was stationed in Shouchun, to return to Luoyang to serve as the Excellency of Works. At the time, Zhong Hui was practising filial mourning because his mother recently died. However, he immediately stopped mourning and went to warn Sima Zhao when he foresaw that Zhuge Dan would disobey the order. Sima Zhao felt that it was troublesome to change the order since it had already been sent out so he did not take any action. Zhuge Dan started a rebellion in Shouchun later. Zhong Hui accompanied Sima Zhao as he led imperial forces to attack the rebels.

When Zhuge Dan rebelled in Shouchun, Sun Chen, the regent of Wei's rival state Eastern Wu, ordered the general Quan Yì and others to lead Wu forces to support Zhuge Dan. Quan Yì had disagreements with his relatives Quan Hui and Quan Yí, who were in the Wu capital, Jianye (建業; present-day Nanjing, Jiangsu). Quan Hui and Quan Yí brought along their families and followers and defected to Wei. When Zhong Hui received news about their defection, he suggested to Sima Zhao to ask Quan Hui and Quan Yí to write a secret letter to Quan Yì and lie to him that Sun Chen was displeased by Quan Yì's failure to conquer Shouchun and wanted to execute Quan Yì's family, hence they decided to defect to Wei. Quan Yì became fearful so he brought along his troops and surrendered to Sima Zhao. Without support from Wu, Zhuge Dan's rebels were defeated by Sima Zhao's forces and Shouchun was taken back by Wei. Zhong Hui was more highly regarded than before by Sima Zhao due to the success of his plan. His contemporaries also compared him to Zhang Liang, a strategist who served under the Han dynasty's founder, Emperor Gao.

After Zhong Hui returned to Luoyang, the Wei imperial court offered him the position of Minister Coachman, but he turned down the offer and chose to be a clerk in Sima Zhao's office. He was one of Sima Zhao's close aides. Later, the imperial court wanted to enfeoff him as the "Marquis of Chen" to honour him for his contributions in suppressing Zhuge Dan's rebellion, but he declined to accept the marquis title. The court respected his decision and appointed him as the Colonel-Director of Retainers instead. Zhong Hui was still heavily involved in politics in the imperial court even though he did not serve in the court. He also played a major role in instigating Sima Zhao to execute Ji Kang.

Conquest of Shu

Strategic planning and opening moves
Between 247 and 262, Jiang Wei, a general from Wei's rival state Shu Han, led a series of military campaigns to attack Wei's western borders, but failed to make any significant territorial gains. Sima Zhao felt that Shu was growing weak and lacking in resources after all the campaigns, hence he wanted to launch a large-scale invasion of Shu to eliminate it. Among those he consulted, only Zhong Hui agreed that Shu could be conquered. Zhong Hui assisted Sima Zhao in formulating a strategy for the conquest of Shu.

In the winter of 262–263, Zhong Hui was appointed General Who Guards the West and granted imperial authority to manage military affairs in the Guanzhong region. Sima Zhao also mobilised military forces from the various provinces in Wei and ordered Tang Zi to oversee the construction of warships in preparation for an invasion on Wei's other rival state, Eastern Wu.

In the autumn of 263, the Wei imperial court issued an edict ordering Deng Ai and Zhuge Xu to lead 30,000 troops each and attack Shu from two directions: Deng Ai's force would pass through Gansong (甘松; southeast of present-day Têwo County, Gansu) and Tazhong (沓中; northwest of present-day Zhugqu County, Gansu), and engage Jiang Wei's army; Zhuge Xu's force would pass through Wujie Bridge (武街橋; northwest of present-day Wen County, Gansu) and block Jiang Wei's retreat route. Zhong Hui led another army, numbering some 100,000 men, and entered Shu territory via the Xie Valley (斜谷; southwest of present-day Mei County, Shaanxi) and Luo Valley (駱谷; southwest of present-day Zhouzhi County, Shaanxi).

Zhong Hui ordered Xu Yi, a son of the veteran Wei general Xu Chu, to oversee the construction of a road leading into Shu. However, when the road turned out to be poorly built, Zhong Hui disregarded Xu Yi's background and had him executed for failing his mission. The Wei army was shocked at Zhong Hui's audacity.

Engagements with Shu forces
In response to the Wei invasion, the Shu government ordered its armed forces to refrain from engaging the enemy and instead retreat to Hancheng (漢城; east of present-day Mian County, Shaanxi) and Lecheng (樂城; east of present-day Chenggu County, Shaanxi) and hold their positions. Liu Qin, the Administrator of the Wei-controlled Weixing Commandery (魏興郡; around present-day Ankang, Shaanxi), led his army through the Ziwu Valley (子午谷; east of present-day Yang County, Shaanxi) towards the Shu-controlled Hanzhong Commandery. The Shu officers Wang Han and Jiang Bin defended Hancheng and Lecheng respectively with 5,000 troops each. Zhong Hui ordered his subordinates Xun Kai and Li Fu to lead 10,000 men each to attack Hancheng and Lecheng, while he led his main army towards Yang'an Pass (陽安口; also known as Yangping Pass, in present-day Ningqiang County, Shaanxi). Along the way, he sent his men to pay respects on his behalf at Zhuge Liang's tomb (at the foot of Mount Dingjun, Mian County, Shaanxi). When he arrived at Yang'an Pass, he ordered Hu Lie to lead the attack on the pass. Hu Lie succeeded in capturing the pass and the supplies stored there by Shu forces.

Jiang Wei retreated from Tazhong towards Yinping (陰平; northwest of present-day Wen County, Gansu), where he rallied his troops and prepared to reinforce Yang'an Pass. However, he retreated to a fort at Baishui (白水; in present-day Qingchuan County, Sichuan) when he heard that Yang'an Pass had been captured by Wei forces. He rendezvoused with the Shu generals Zhang Yi, Liao Hua and others and moved to defend their position at the fortified mountain pass Jiange (劒閣; also known as Jianmen Pass, in present-day Jiange County, Sichuan). Zhong Hui wrote a long address to the Shu forces, urging them to give up resistance and surrender to Wei.

Deng Ai pursued Jiang Wei to Yinping, where he formed a group of elite soldiers from among his troops and took a shortcut to Jiangyou (江由; north of present-day Jiangyou, Sichuan) through Deyang Village (德陽亭; northwest of present-day Jiange County, Sichuan), and approached Mianzhu, which was near the Shu capital Chengdu. He asked Zhuge Xu to join him. Zhuge Xu had received orders to block Jiang Wei's advance and was not authorised to join Deng Ai in his mission, so he led his force to Baishui County to rendezvous with Zhong Hui. Zhong Hui ordered Tian Zhang and others to lead a force to bypass the west of Jiange and approach Jiangyou. Along the way, they encountered three groups of Shu ambushers, defeated them and destroyed their camps. Deng Ai let Tian Zhang lead the vanguard and clear the path.

Fall of Shu
When Zhong Hui and Zhuge Xu arrived near Jiange, Zhong Hui desired to seize control of Zhuge Xu's command, so he secretly reported to the Wei imperial court that Zhuge Xu displayed cowardice in battle. As a result, Zhuge Xu was stripped of his command and sent back to the Wei capital Luoyang, while Zhong Hui took command of his army. Zhong Hui then ordered an attack on Jiange but failed to conquer the mountain pass because the Shu forces put up a strong defence, so he retreated.

In the meantime, Deng Ai and his men reached Mianzhu, where they defeated a Shu army led by Zhuge Zhan, who was killed in action. When Jiang Wei learnt of Zhuge Zhan's death, he led his forces east towards Ba Commandery (巴郡; present-day Chongqing). Zhong Hui led his army to Fu County (涪縣; present-day Mianyang, Sichuan) and ordered Hu Lie, Tian Xu, Pang Hui and others to lead troops to pursue Jiang Wei. At the same time, Deng Ai and his men had arrived outside Chengdu. The Shu emperor Liu Shan surrendered to Deng Ai without putting up a fight, and then gave orders to Jiang Wei to surrender to Zhong Hui. Jiang Wei headed to Fu County, where he ordered his men to lay down their arms and surrender to Zhong Hui.

Following the successful conquest of Shu, Zhong Hui wrote a memorial to the Wei imperial court to report his contributions and urge the government to pacify and restore peace in Shu through benevolent governance. He also gave strict orders forbidding his troops from plundering and pillaging the Shu lands, and treated the former Shu officials in a respectful manner. He got along very well with Jiang Wei.

In the winter of 263–264, the Wei imperial court issued a decree to praise Zhong Hui for his contributions in the conquest of Shu. Zhong Hui was appointed Minister over the Masses, promoted from a village-level marquis to a county-level marquis, and had the number of taxable households in his marquisate increased to 10,000. His two (adoptive) sons were each granted a village marquis title and 1,000 taxable households in their marquisate.

Downfall and death

Arresting Deng Ai

Zhong Hui had long harboured the intention of rebelling against Wei. When he saw that Deng Ai behaved in an autocratic manner even though his military command was authorised by the Wei imperial court, he secretly reported to the court that Deng was plotting a rebellion. He was skilled in imitating people's handwriting. After intercepting a report written by Deng Ai to the Wei imperial court, he edited the report to make it sound arrogant and demanding. At the same time, he also destroyed a letter from Sima Zhao to Deng Ai. The Wei government fell for Zhong Hui's ruse and ordered Deng Ai to be arrested and transported back to Luoyang in a prison cart. Sima Zhao was worried that Deng Ai would not submit, so he ordered Zhong Hui and Wei Guan to arrest Deng Ai. With Zhong Hui and his troops following behind, Wei Guan went to Deng Ai's camp in Chengdu and used Sima Zhao's letter of authorisation to order Deng's soldiers to put down their weapons. Deng Ai was arrested and placed in a prison cart.

Planning
Zhong Hui had been wary of Deng Ai, so after Deng was arrested, he immediately assumed command of the Wei forces in the former Shu territories. He was overwhelmed by feelings of megalomania after seeing that he wielded great power in his hands, so he decided to rebel against Wei. He came up with a strategy for capturing the Wei capital, Luoyang, in the following sequence:
 Jiang Wei would lead a vanguard force out of the Xie Valley to attack the city of Chang'an. Zhong Hui would follow behind with the main army and provide support.
 After capturing Chang'an, the army would be split into two groups – infantry and cavalry. The infantry would sail along the Wei and Yellow rivers towards Meng Ford near Luoyang while the cavalry would ride towards Luoyang on land. Zhong Hui estimated that the journey would take five days.
 The infantry and cavalry would rendezvous outside Luoyang and attack the city together.

Zhong Hui received a letter from Sima Zhao, which read: "I fear Deng Ai might not submit. I have ordered Jia Chong to lead 10,000 infantry and cavalry into the Xie Valley and station at Lecheng. I will lead 100,000 troops to garrison at Chang'an. We will be meeting each other soon." After reading the letter, Zhong Hui was shocked and he told his close aides, "When His Excellency ordered me to arrest Deng Ai, he knew I was capable of accomplishing the task alone. However, now, since he has brought his troops here, he must be suspecting me. We should take action quickly. If we succeed, the Empire is ours. If we fail, we can retreat back to Shu Han and do as Liu Bei did before us. It is widely known that my plans have never failed once since the Shouchun rebellions. How can I be contented with such fame?"

Mutiny
Zhong Hui arrived in Chengdu on 29 February 264. The following day, he summoned all the high-ranking officers and former Shu officers to the old Shu imperial court in the name of holding a memorial service for the recently deceased Empress Dowager Guo. During the service, he showed them an imperial decree and claimed it was issued by the empress dowager before she died. In the decree, Empress Dowager Guo wanted all those who were loyal to Wei to rise up against Sima Zhao and remove him from power. The decree was actually a fake one written by Zhong Hui. Zhong Hui sought the officers' opinions, asked them to sign on a list if they agreed to carry out the empress dowager's dying wish, and then instructed his close aides to take over command of the various military units. He then had all the officers detained in their respective offices with the doors shut, and ordered the gates of the city to be closed and tightly guarded.

Qiu Jian, an officer serving under Zhong Hui, used to be a subordinate of Hu Lie. Hu Lie recommended him to Sima Zhao. Zhong Hui favoured and regarded Qiu Jian highly and requested for him to be transferred to his unit. Qiu Jian sympathised with Hu Lie, who was detained alone inside a room, so he approached Zhong Hui and said that each of the detained officers should have a servant to attend to their personal needs. Zhong Hui agreed. Hu Lie lied to his servant and wrote a letter to his sons, in which he claimed he heard from Qiu Jian that Zhong Hui was planning to purge the officers not from his own unit by luring them into a trap and killing them. The rumour spread like wildfire among all the detained officers. When Zhong Hui's men received news about the rumour, they suggested to their superior to execute all the officers holding the rank of Cavalry Commandant of the Standard and above. Zhong Hui could not decide on what to do.

Around noon on 3 March 264, Hu Lie's sons and subordinates started beating the drums and their soldiers followed suit. After that, they rushed towards the city gates in a disorderly manner because they had no one to lead them. Around the time, Jiang Wei was collecting his armour and weapons from Zhong Hui when they heard shouting and received news that a fire had broken out. Moments later, it was reported that many soldiers were crowding near the city gates. Zhong Hui was surprised and he asked Jiang Wei, "Those men are causing trouble. What should we do?" Jiang Wei replied, "Kill them." Zhong Hui then ordered his men to kill the officers who were still detained in their offices. Some of the officers used pieces of furniture to block the doors. Zhong Hui's men rammed the doors but could not force them open. A while later, there were reports of people climbing up the city gates on ladders and of people setting fire to buildings. Chaos broke out and arrows were fired in all directions. The detained officers broke out of captivity, regrouped with their men, and attacked Zhong Hui and Jiang Wei. Zhong Hui and Jiang Wei fought the mutinying soldiers and slew about five or six of them, but were eventually overwhelmed and killed by them. Zhong Hui was 40 years old (by East Asian age reckoning) when he died. Hundreds of lives were lost in the mutiny.

Sima Zhao's foresight
Initially, when Sima Zhao wanted to put Zhong Hui in charge of leading the Wei army to conquer Shu, Shao Ti warned him that Zhong Hui might rebel against Wei because he was in command of an army of thousands, was single, and had no family to worry about. Sima Zhao laughed and said he understood Shao Ti's concern very well, but chose to let Zhong Hui lead the Wei army because he had faith in Zhong's ability to conquer Shu. He also predicted that Zhong Hui would not succeed even if he rebelled because of two reasons. First, the people of Shu would not support Zhong Hui because they were already fearful after witnessing the fall of Shu. Second, the Wei forces would not support Zhong Hui because they were already exhausted and homesick after the campaign.

Later, after Zhong Hui secretly accused Deng Ai of plotting a rebellion, Sima Zhao wanted to lead his forces to station at Chang'an. Shao Ti told Sima Zhao that there was no need for him to go to Chang'an because Zhong Hui was capable of arresting Deng Ai on his own since he had five to six times more troops than Deng Ai. Sima Zhao replied, "Have you forgotten what you said previously? Why are you asking me not to go (to Chang'an) now? Please keep secret what we spoke about. I treat people with trust and respect. As long as they remain loyal to me, I will not doubt them. Jia Chong recently asked me, 'Are you suspicious of Zhong Hui?' I replied, 'If I send you on a mission today, do you think I doubt you?' He could not respond to my reply. Everything will be settled when I arrive in Chang'an." By the time Sima Zhao reached Chang'an, Zhong Hui had already been killed in the mutiny, just as Sima Zhao foresaw.

Family and relatives
Zhong Hui's father, Zhong Yao, was a prominent politician and calligrapher who held the position of Grand Tutor in the Wei imperial court. Zhong Hui's mother, Zhang Changpu, was one of Zhong Yao's concubines and was known for her virtuous conduct, wisdom, and influential role in her son's early education.

Zhong Hui's elder half-brother, Zhong Yu, died in the winter of 263. Zhong Hui made no response to the death of his brother. Zhong Yu had four sons: Zhong Jun, Zhong Yong, Zhong Yi and Zhong Chan. Zhong Yi was raised as Zhong Hui's adoptive son because Zhong Hui was single and had no children. Zhong Yong was killed along with his uncle Zhong Hui during the mutiny and his family members were executed. In the aftermath of Zhong Hui's failed rebellion, Zhong Jun, Zhong Yi and Zhong Chan were implicated, arrested and placed on death row for their relations to Zhong Hui. However, Sima Zhao took into consideration that Zhong Yao and Zhong Yu had rendered meritorious service to Wei, hence he decided to let them preserve their posterity. He made the Wei emperor Cao Huan issue an imperial decree, which pardoned Zhong Jun and Zhong Chan and restored them to their original official positions and titles. Zhong Yi, however, was executed because he was Zhong Hui's adoptive son and was hence not eligible for the pardon.

It is believed that Sima Zhao decided to spare Zhong Jun and Zhong Chan because Zhong Yu once warned him that Zhong Hui was manipulative and should not be placed in positions with great power. Sima Zhao laughed, praised Zhong Yu for his honest advice, and promised that he would spare Zhong Yu's family if Zhong Hui really did commit treason.

Appraisal

Chen Shou
Chen Shou, who wrote Zhong Hui's biography in the Records of the Three Kingdoms (Sanguozhi), praised him as "elite and skilled with numerous strategies", then lumped Zhong Hui together with Wang Ling, Guanqiu Jian, and Zhuge Dan in his criticism: "They were famous for their various talents, which helped them rise to high positions. It was a pity that 
they were overly ambitious, had morally crooked ideas, and failed to recognise the hidden pitfalls around them. These resulted in their downfalls and the extermination of their families. Can it be any more fatuous than this?"

Xiahou Ba
The Shiyu recorded that when the Wei general Xiahou Ba defected to Shu, the Shu officials asked him, "What does Sima Yi do best?" Xiahou Ba replied, "Solidifying his family's position in Wei." They asked him again, "Who are the talents in the Wei capital?" Xiahou Ba replied, "There's one Zhong Shiji. Wu and Shu should be worried if he's in charge of the Wei government."

The Han Jin Chunqiu mentioned that the Shu general Jiang Wei also asked Xiahou Ba, "Now that Sima Yi is in control of the Wei government, is he still planning to launch any campaigns against Shu and Wu?" Xiahou Ba replied, "He focuses on strengthening his family's control of the Wei government and doesn't have time to bother about external affairs. However, there's one Zhong Shiji. He may be young, but he'll definitely become a threat to Wu and Shu in the future. Despite so, even the most extraordinary people can't control him." Xiahou Ba was proven right 15 years later because Zhong Hui was one of the key figures in the Wei conquest of Shu.

Pei Songzhi added the Shiyu account to support what Xi Zuochi wrote in the Han Jin Chunqiu.

In popular culture

Zhong Hui is first introduced as a playable character in the seventh instalment of Koei's Dynasty Warriors video game series.

See also
 Lists of people of the Three Kingdoms

Notes

References
Citations from the Sanguozhi

 Chen, Shou (3rd century). Records of the Three Kingdoms (Sanguozhi).
Citations from the Sanguozhi zhu

 Pei, Songzhi (5th century). Annotations to Records of the Three Kingdoms (Sanguozhi zhu).
Other sources

 Sima, Guang (1084). Zizhi Tongjian.

External links 
 

225 births
264 deaths
Artists from Luoyang
Cao Wei calligraphers
Cao Wei essayists
Cao Wei generals
Cao Wei politicians
Generals from Henan
Politicians from Luoyang
Three Kingdoms people killed in battle
Three Rebellions in Shouchun